The House of Nahyan are one of the six ruling families of the United Arab Emirates, and are based in the capital Abu Dhabi, United Arab Emirates. Al Nahyan is a branch of the House of Al Falahi (Āl Bū Falāḥ), a branch of the Bani Yas tribe, and are related to the House of Al Falasi from which the ruling family of Dubai, Al Maktoum, descends. The Bani Yas came to Abu Dhabi in the 18th century from Liwa Oasis. They have ruled Abu Dhabi since 1793, and previously ruled Liwa. Five of the rulers were overthrown and eight were killed in coups between 1793 and 1966; many were brothers. The Al Nayhan family control multiple sovereign wealth funds including the Abu Dhabi Investment Authority and Mubadala Investment Company that have an estimated $1 trillion worth of assets under management.

Members

Notable members of the Al Nahyan family include:

Rulers of Abu Dhabi 
 1761–1793: Sheikh Dhiyab bin Isa Al Nahyan 
 1793–1816: Sheikh Shakhbut bin Dhiyab Al Nahyan 
 1816–1818: Sheikh Muhammad bin Shakhbut Al Nahyan 
 1818–1833: Sheikh Tahnun bin Shakhbut Al Nahyan 
 1833–1845: Sheikh Khalifa bin Shakhbut Al Nahyan
 1845–1855: Sheikh Saeed bin Tahnun Al Nahyan
 1855–1909: Sheikh Zayed bin Khalifa Al Nahyan
 1909–1912: Sheikh Tahnun bin Zayed Al Nahyan 
 1912–1922: Sheikh Hamdan bin Zayed Al Nahyan 
 1922–1926: Sheikh Sultan bin Zayed Al Nahyan 
 1926–1928: Sheikh Saqr bin Zayed Al Nahyan 
 1928–1966: Sheikh Shakhbut bin Sultan Al Nahyan 
 1966–2004: Sheikh Zayed bin Sultan Al Nahyan
 2004–2022: Sheikh Khalifa  bin Zayed Al Nahyan 
 2022–present: Sheikh Mohamed bin Zayed Al Nahyan

Controversy
Some members of the Royal family were found to have treated low-income workers inhumanely. Some of these incidents have occurred outside the UAE.

See also

 Royal families of the United Arab Emirates
 List of Sunni Muslim dynasties
 List of rulers of separate Emirates of the United Arab Emirates

References 

 
History of the Emirate of Abu Dhabi
Tribes of the United Arab Emirates
Arab dynasties